is a Japanese comedian, actor, television presenter, and newscaster who is a member of the comedy duo Honjamaka. He is represented by Watanabe Entertainment.

Filmography

TV series

Current appearances

Specials

Former appearances

Drama

Radio series

Advertisements

Films

References

External links
 

Japanese comedians
Japanese male actors
Japanese television presenters
Japanese journalists
1964 births
Living people
People from Kagoshima